The Fornax Cluster is a cluster of galaxies lying at a distance of 19 megaparsecs (62 million light-years). It has an estimated mass of  solar masses, making it the second richest galaxy cluster within 100 million light-years, after the considerably larger Virgo Cluster. It may be associated with the nearby Eridanus Group. It lies primarily in the constellation Fornax, with its southern boundaries partially crossing into the constellation of Eridanus, and covers an area of sky about 6° across or about 28 sq degrees.

The Fornax Cluster is a particularly valuable source of information about the evolution of such clusters due to its relatively close proximity to the Sun. It also shows the gravitational effects of a merger of a galaxy subgroup with the main galaxy group, which in turn lends clues about the associated galactic superstructure.  At the centre of the cluster lies NGC 1399.  Other cluster members include NGC 1316 (the group's brightest galaxy), NGC 1365, NGC 1427A, NGC 1427 and NGC 1404.

Structure 
Fornax can be divided into two subclusters: the main one, centered on NGC 1399, and a subgroup 3 degrees to the southwest centered on the lenticular galaxy NGC 1316 that is in the process of infalling with the largest subcluster to finally merge with it, and whose galaxies are experiencing strong star formation activity.

Intracluster medium 
As with many other galaxy clusters, Fornax intracluster medium is filled with a hot, rarefied gas that emits X-rays. and contains a number of intergalactic stars, some of which have produced novae.

List of cluster members 

(*) - Membership is uncertain

Gallery

See also
List of galaxy groups and clusters
Coma Cluster
Eridanus Cluster
Norma Cluster
Virgo Cluster
NGC 1365

References

External links

 
Fornax (constellation)
S0373
Southern Supercluster